A Jacobus is an English gold coin of the reign of James I, worth 25 shillings. The name of the coin comes from the Latin inscription surrounding the King's head on the obverse of the coin, IACOBUS D G MAG BRIT FRA ET HI REX ("James, by the grace of God, of Britain, France and Ireland King").

Isaac Newton refers to the coin in a letter to John Locke:
 The Jacobus piece coin'd for 20 shillings is the : part of a pound Troy, and a Carolus 20s piece is of the same weight. But a broad Jacobus (as I find by weighing some of them) is the 38th part of a pound Troy.

These correspond to masses of 9.10 and 9.82 grams respectively, making the broad Jacobus slightly heavier.

References

Coins of England
English gold coins